Diadegma albertae is a wasp first described by Walley in 1929. No subspecies are listed.

References

albertae
Insects described in 1929